The National Lacrosse Conference (NLC) was an NCAA Division I women's lacrosse-only college athletic conference whose members were located primarily in the Southeastern United States, with one team, Detroit (now athletically branded as Detroit Mercy), located in Michigan. The league formed in 2008 in advance of the 2009 NCAA lacrosse season, and played its first season with four member teams. Three more schools joined for the 2010 season with an additional school joining in 2011.  The NLC had 8 member schools by the end of its existence. The NLC did not have an automatic bid to the NCAA Tournament; conference members could qualify through an at-large bid.

The conference disbanded in 2012 after the Atlantic Sun Conference (ASUN) and Big South Conference began sponsoring women's lacrosse. In the ASUN, Jacksonville had been the only full member to sponsor women's lacrosse, but Kennesaw State and Stetson added the sport in 2012–13. Those schools brought Detroit and Howard into ASUN lacrosse. As for the Big South, three full members—High Point, Liberty, and Presbyterian—sponsored the sport during the NLC's final season in 2012. The number of full Big South members sponsoring the sport increased to seven for the 2012–13 school year when NLC member Longwood, previously a basketball independent, joined the Big South and Campbell, Coastal Carolina, and Winthrop added the sport. Davidson followed these schools into Big South lacrosse.

Final members

Conference champions
 2009 – Longwood
 2010 – Longwood
 2011 – High Point

References

External links
 

College lacrosse leagues in the United States
Women's lacrosse competitions in the United States
Defunct NCAA Division I conferences
2008 establishments in the United States
2012 disestablishments in the United States
Sports leagues established in 2008
Sports leagues disestablished in 2012